The Karagandy Zoo is the state zoo of the city Karaganda in Kazakhstan.

The zoo is best known as the home of the "talking" elephant Batyr until his death in 1993.

See also
 List of zoos
 Batyr, the zoo's talking elephant
 Almaty Zoo

Notes

External links

 Karaganda Zoo

Zoos in Kazakhstan
Zoo